The giant salmon carp   (Aaptosyax grypus), also termed the Mekong giant salmon carp, is a species of freshwater fish in the family Cyprinidae and the single species in the monotypic genus Aaptosyax. It is endemic to the middle reaches of the Mekong River in northern Cambodia, Laos and Thailand. Its population is much reduced (>90%) as a result of overfishing and habitat degradation, and it is now considered Critically Endangered.

References

giant salmon carp
Freshwater fish of Southeast Asia
giant salmon carp
Taxonomy articles created by Polbot